Kalaharituber is a fungal genus in the family Pezizaceae. It is a monotypic genus, whose single truffle-like species, Kalaharituber pfeilii,  is found in the Kalahari Desert, which spans the larger part of Botswana, the east of Namibia and the Northern Cape Province of South Africa.

Taxonomy
The fungus was first described scientifically in 1895 by German mycologist Paul Christoph Hennings as Terfezia pfeilii. It was moved to its own genus in 2005 by James Trappe and Varda Kagan-Zur.

Description 
Fruiting bodies can be up to 12 cm in diameter. These weigh approximately 200 grams, although larger rains (which affect weight) can cause them to weigh twice as much. These fruits grow close to the surface, which causes surface cracks on the ground above after rains. These fruiting bodies can occur as much as 40 cm away from the main hyphae.

Habitat 
Kalaharituber pfeilii is found the Kalahari Desert, as well as in other arid regions of South Africa, Angola, Botswana and Namibia. It is found in soils with a pH ranging from 5.5 to 6.5, with a sand content varying from 94%-97%, a clay content varying from 2%-5% and a silt content varying from 1%-4%.

Mycorrhizal relations with plants 
Kalaharituber pfeilii is known to form an ectomycorrhizal relationship with Citrillus lanatus (watermelon), and is suspected to have a number of other possible relationships with other plant species. These include Sorghum bicolor, Eragrostis spp., Grewia flava, several species of acacia, and Cynodon dactylon.

Edibility 
Kalaharituber pfeilii is eaten by humans as well as by meerkats, hyenas, baboons and bat-eared foxes. According to a case study by the Australian National Botanic Gardens, the fruiting body is eaten by the Khoisan and other indigenous peoples of the Kalahari. Some commercial use of the species occurs.

Conservation 
The current populations of K. pfeilii are thought to be in deterioration, with possible causes advanced being over-harvesting, climate change or the land practices used in K. pfeilii habitats.

References

Fungi of Africa
Pezizaceae
Monotypic fungi genera
Taxa named by James Trappe
Pezizales genera